Kosmos 562 ( meaning Cosmos 562), known before launch as DS-P1-Yu No.66, was a Soviet satellite which was launched in 1973 as part of the Dnepropetrovsk Sputnik programme. It was a  spacecraft, which was built by the Yuzhnoye Design Bureau, and was used as a radar calibration target for anti-ballistic missile tests.

Launch 
Kosmos 562 was successfully launched into low Earth orbit at 11:29:47 UTC on 5 June 1973. The launch took place from Site 133/1 at the Plesetsk Cosmodrome, and used a Kosmos-2I 63SM carrier rocket.

Orbit 
Upon reaching orbit, the satellite was assigned its Kosmos designation, and received the International Designator 1973-035A. The North American Aerospace Defense Command assigned it the catalogue number 06665.

Kosmos 562 was the sixty-third of seventy nine DS-P1-Yu satellites to be launched, and the fifty-seventh of seventy two to successfully reach orbit. It remained in orbit until it decayed and reentered the atmosphere on 7 January 1974.

See also 

 1973 in spaceflight

References 

1973 in spaceflight
Kosmos satellites
Spacecraft launched in 1973
Dnepropetrovsk Sputnik program